Brooke Lynn Hytes is the stage name of Brock Edward Hayhoe (born March 10, 1986), a Canadian drag queen, ballet dancer, performer, and television personality. After working as a dancer with Cape Town City Ballet and Les Ballets Trockadero de Monte Carlo, Hytes achieved international recognition for competing on the eleventh season of RuPaul's Drag Race; Hytes placed second, only to winner Yvie Oddly. Hytes is the first Canadian to compete in the series. Hytes is also a main judge on the spin-off series Canada's Drag Race, becoming the first Drag Race contestant to become a full-time judge in the franchise.

Early life 
Hayhoe was born on March 10, 1986, in Toronto. He attended high school at Etobicoke School of the Arts. When he was 15, he started to take ballet at the National Ballet School of Canada for five years. He came out as gay when he was 18. He is of Swedish and French descent.

Career 
At 20, Hytes moved to South Africa and performed at the Cape Town City Ballet. She later moved to New York City and joined Les Ballets Trockadero de Monte Carlo. In 2014, Hytes won the Miss Continental pageant.

Hytes was announced to be one of fifteen contestants competing on season eleven of RuPaul's Drag Race on January 24, 2019. She won the main challenges in episode one, five and eleven, placing in the top of a challenge a record-breaking nine times throughout the season. This is the most top 3 positions achieved by any contestant in a single season in RuPaul's Drag Race history. She was in a "double-shantay" alongside Yvie Oddly in the Snatch Game episode after bombing her Celine Dion impersonation; the duo's lip sync to Demi Lovato's "Sorry Not Sorry" was lauded over by critics, and declared by many to be one of the best lip syncs in the history of the series.

Throughout the season, Hytes developed an on-show romance with Vanessa Vanjie Mateo, dubbed "Branjie". Hytes and Mateo were in the bottom two of episode twelve, with Hytes emerging victorious in a lip sync battle to Aretha Franklin's "A Deeper Love", making Mateo the last queen to be eliminated prior to the finale. Hytes finished as a runner-up on the eleventh season of Rupaul's Drag Race, ultimately losing to Yvie Oddly in the final lip sync for the crown.

In June 2019, Hytes was one of 37 queens to be featured on the cover of New York magazine. On September 26, she was announced as a full-time judge for Canada's Drag Race, the Canadian spin-off of RuPaul's Drag Race. She is the first contestant from any series in the Drag Race franchise to become a full-time judge. On November 11, she won a People's Choice Award for "Most Hypeworthy Canadian".

On March 25, 2021, Hytes released a single with Priyanka, titled "Queen of the North". In May 2021, Hytes, McKenzie, and Bowyer-Chapman won the Canadian Screen Award for Best Host or Presenter in a Factual or Reality/Competition Series at the 9th Canadian Screen Awards. The same month, she launched a podcast with Priyanka, Famous This Week, and was announced as the host of 1 Queen 5 Queers, a reboot of 1 Girl 5 Gays, for Crave.

Personal life

Hytes was living in Nashville, Tennessee before being accepted on Drag Race. She since moved to Los Angeles.

Her drag mothers are Farra N. Hyte and Washington Heights, and her drag sister is Heaven Lee Hytes.

Titles awards

Filmography

Film

Music videos

Television

Web series

Discography

Singles

Awards and nominations

References

External links
 

1986 births
Living people
21st-century Canadian LGBT people
Canadian drag queens
Canadian emigrants to the United States
Canadian gay men
Canadian male ballet dancers
Canadian people of Norwegian descent
Canadian Screen Award winners
Gay entertainers
LGBT dancers
National Ballet of Canada dancers
Participants in Canadian reality television series
People from Nashville, Tennessee
People from Toronto
Brooke Lynn Hytes
Trockaderos